Rhynd is a hamlet in Perth and Kinross, Scotland.

The village has an unusual "K3" telephone box, a concrete variant of the more common "K2", which is protected as a category A listed building as the only surviving example in Scotland.

The name Rhynd comes from the Gaelic roinn meaning a share or a portion (of land).

References

Citations

Sources

Villages in Perth and Kinross